The 2014 Winter Olympics, officially known as the XXII Olympic Winter Games, were a winter multi-sport event held in Sochi, Russia, from 7 to 23 February. A total of 2,873 athletes from 88 nations participated in 98 events in 7 sports across 15 different disciplines. 

Initially, host nation Russia matched the Soviet Union's 1976 achievement of thirteen gold medals, but 4 gold, 8 silver and 1 bronze medals were stripped due to doping. However, later the Court of Arbitration for Sport reinstated 2 gold, 7 silver and 1 bronze medals.

The Netherlands achieved four podium sweeps in the speed skating, dominating the men's 500 metres, men's 5,000 metres, men's 10,000 metres, and women's 1,500 metres, surpassing the previous record of two podium sweeps. Slovenia won its first Winter Olympics gold medal ever, in alpine skiing. This was also the first Winter Olympic gold medal tie. Latvia won its first Olympic gold medal due to medals reallocation after the IOC retested doping samples in November 2017. Luger Armin Zöggeler of Italy became the first athlete to achieve six Winter Olympic medals over six consecutive games, all achieved at the men's singles event. Speed skater Ireen Wüst from the Netherlands achieved five medals (two gold and three silver), more than any other athlete. South Korean-born Russian short track speed skater Viktor Ahn, Norwegian cross-country skier Marit Bjørgen, and Belarusian biathlete Darya Domracheva tied for the most gold medals, with three each.

Medal table

The medal table is based on information provided by the International Olympic Committee (IOC) and is consistent with IOC convention in its published medal tables. By default, the table is ordered by the number of gold medals the athletes from a nation have won, where nation is an entity represented by a National Olympic Committee (NOC). The number of silver medals is taken into consideration next and then the number of bronze medals. 

In the women's downhill event in alpine skiing two gold medals were awarded for a first place tie, no silver medal was awarded for the event. In the men's super-G alpine skiing, two bronze medals were awarded for a third place tie.

Key
 Changes in medal standings (see below)

Changes in medal standings

Russian team doping case

On 18 July 2016, the McLaren Report was published alleging that the Russian government had sanctioned the use of performance-enhancing drugs by Russian athletes in the 2014 Winter Olympics. 

On 9 December 2016, a World Anti-Doping Agency report expanded upon the previous report and included the note that "Two [Russian] [sport] athletes, winners of 4 Sochi Olympic Gold medals, and a female Silver medal winner in [sport] had samples with salt readings that were physiologically impossible" and that "Twelve [Russian] medal winning athletes ... from 44 examined samples had scratches and marks on the inside of the caps of their B sample bottles, indicating tampering".

In December 2016, following the release of the McLaren Report on Russian doping at the Sochi Olympics, the International Olympic Committee announced the initiation of an investigation of 28 Russian athletes at the Sochi Olympic Games. The number later rose to 46.

From 1 November 2017 to 22 December 2017, the IOC handled 46 cases related to Russian team doping. 3 cases have been closed without sanction and without official disclosing the names of suspected athletes. 43 Russian athletes were disqualified from the 2014 Winter Olympics and banned from competing in the 2018 edition and all other future Olympic Games as part of the Oswald Commission.

All but one of these athletes appealed against their bans to the Court of Arbitration for Sport. On 1 February 2018, the court overturned the sanctions on 28 athletes meaning that their Sochi medals and results are reinstated, but decided that there was sufficient evidence against 11 athletes to uphold their Sochi sanctions. On 24 September 2020, the court overturned the sanctions on a further 2 athletes meaning that their Sochi medals and results are reinstated, but decided that there was sufficient evidence against 1 athlete to uphold their Sochi sanctions. The court also decided that none of the 42 athletes should be banned from all future Olympic Games, but only the 2018 Games.

On 1 February 2018, the IOC said in a statement that “the result of the CAS decision does not mean that athletes from the group of 28 will be invited to the 2018 Games. Not being sanctioned does not automatically confer the privilege of an invitation” and that “this [case] may have a serious impact on the future fight against doping”. The IOC found it important to note that CAS Secretary General "insisted that the CAS decision does not mean that these 28 athletes are innocent” and that they would consider an appeal against the courts decision. On 9 February 2018, the CAS dismissed 47 appeals from Russian athletes and coaches to the IOC's decision not invite these athletes and coaches to the 2018 Olympics. On 19 January 2019, the IOC's appeal of Legkov's case was rejected and the organization decided not to proceed with 27 remaining cases because the chance of winning would be very low. The IOC voiced its disappointment with the decision.

List of official changes

List of possible changes in medal standings

List of official changes by country

Notes

See also
2014 Winter Paralympics medal table

References

External links
 
 
 

Medal table
Russia sport-related lists
Winter Olympics medal tables